A velar click, or more precisely a back-released velar click, is a click consonant found in paralinguistic use in languages across Africa, such as Wolof. The tongue is in a similar position to other click articulations, such as an alveolar click, and like other clicks, the airstream mechanism is lingual.  However, unlike other clicks, the salient sound is produced by releasing the rear (probably velar) closure of the tongue rather than the front closure.  Consequently, the air that fills the vacuum comes from behind the tongue, from the nasal cavity and the throat. Velar clicks are always voiceless and typically nasal, as nasal airflow is required for a reasonably loud production.

IPA symbol withdrawn
In 1921, the International Phonetic Association (IPA) adopted Daniel Jones' symbol , a turned lowercase K, for the palatal clicks of Khoekhoe.
Jones seems to have first applied the label "velar" in an IPA publication in 1928.
At the time, little was known about the articulation of clicks, and different authors used different labels for the same sounds – Doke, for example, called the same clicks 'alveolar'.
The last mention of the "velar" clicks was in the 1949 Principles. It was omitted when the other three click letters were moved into the symbol chart in 1951, and was not mentioned again.

An actual velar click, in the sense that term is used with the languages of southern Africa, is not possible. A click is articulated with two closures of the tongue or lips. The rear articulation of all clicks is velar or uvular, and the families of dental, alveolar, palatal, and bilabial clicks are defined by the front closure, which is released to cause the influx of air from the front of the mouth that identifies a click. A forward closure in the velar region would leave no room for the air pocket that generates that influx of air.

From 2008 to 2015 the unused letter was picked up by the extensions to the IPA to mark a velodorsal articulation in speech pathology.
However, velar clicks are possible in the sense that the release sequence of the tongue closures can be reversed: in paralinguistic use in languages such as Wolof, it is the rear (velar) closure rather than front one that is released to produce the sound, and such clicks are termed 'velar'.
The IPA letter was resurrected for such sounds, and dropped from the extIPA to avoid confusion with such usage.

Production
Lionnet describes the clicks as follows: 

Velar clicks are produced with closed lips in those languages known to have them.  For this reason, it was at first thought that the front articulation was labial:

However, the labial closure does not appear to be distinctive. Although articulatory measurements have not been done, it appears that the two relevant articulations are dorsal and coronal:  The rear articulation appears to be at the very front of the velum, near the hard palate (at least in Wolof and Laal), and the front articulation is dental or alveolar.  The lips are closed merely because that is their rest position; opening the lips has no effect on the consonant.  That is, the setup of a velar click is very much like one of the coronal clicks, but with the roles of the two closures of the tongue reversed.

In Mundang and Kanuri, the rear articulation is said to be uvular and back-velar rather than front-velar.  Comparisons between the languages have yet to be done.

Occurrence
Paralinguistic velar clicks are attested from a number of languages in west and central Africa, from Senegal in the west to northern Cameroon and southern Chad in the east. The literature reports at least Laal, Mambay, Mundang, and Kanuri in the east, and Wolof and Mauritanian Pulaar in the west.

In Wolof, a back-released velar click is in free variation with a lateral click or an alveolar click.  It means 'yes' when used once, and 'I see' or 'I get it' when repeated.  It's also used for back-channeling.  In Laal as well, it is used for "strong agreement" and back-channeling, and is in free variation with the lateral click.  It appears to have the same two functions in the other languages.

See also
Alveolar click
Bilabial click
Dental click
Lateral click
Palatal click
Retroflex click
Index of phonetics articles
Click consonant

References

Velar consonants
Click consonants